This Was Tomorrow is the debut studio album by Australian musician Seth Sentry. Released in September 2012, the album peaked at number 6 on the ARIA Charts.

At the ARIA Music Awards of 2013 the album was nominated for ARIA Award for Best Urban Album.

At the AIR Awards of 2013, the album won Best Independent Hip Hop/Urban Album.

Reception
Andrew Hickey from Beat Magazine said "This Was Tomorrow finds Melbourne rising star Seth Sentry looking at society and his place in it. The relatable rapper takes us through a typical day, introducing the listener to many of the album's running themes on opening cut 'Campfire'. On album stand-out 'My Scene' he tells outlandish yet believable tales about trying to fit into social groups." Hickey concluded saying "This Was Tomorrow is a triumph and easily one of Australia's finest hip hop releases in 2012."

Chris Yates from The Music said "This Was Tomorrow is a landmark Australian hip hop record."

Track listing

Charts

Certifications

References

Seth Sentry albums
2012 debut albums